Yusuf Alli (born 28 July 1960 in Lagos) is a retired Nigerian long jumper, and three-time Olympian.  He is best known for his gold medal at the 1990 Commonwealth Games.

His personal best is 8.27 metres, achieved at the 1989 African Championships in Athletics in Lagos. This is the Nigerian record.  also 8.39 at the commonwealth games (1990).  He jumped in college for the University of Missouri where he still holds the school records for the long jump - both indoor and outdoor (set in 1984 and 1983 respectively). 
2nd world cup in athletics 1989 Barcelona Spain;
African captain,
longest Nigeria captain,
technical director athletic federation of Nigeria and
manager COJA committee for 8th All African games

Achievements

References

External links

1960 births
Living people
Sportspeople from Lagos
Nigerian male long jumpers
Athletes (track and field) at the 1980 Summer Olympics
Athletes (track and field) at the 1984 Summer Olympics
Athletes (track and field) at the 1988 Summer Olympics
Athletes (track and field) at the 1990 Commonwealth Games
Commonwealth Games gold medallists for Nigeria
Commonwealth Games medallists in athletics
Olympic athletes of Nigeria
African Games silver medalists for Nigeria
African Games medalists in athletics (track and field)
World Athletics Championships athletes for Nigeria
Universiade medalists in athletics (track and field)
Athletes (track and field) at the 1987 All-Africa Games
Athletes (track and field) at the 1991 All-Africa Games
Universiade gold medalists for Nigeria
Medalists at the 1983 Summer Universiade
20th-century Nigerian people
21st-century Nigerian people
Medallists at the 1990 Commonwealth Games